Billon may refer to:

 Billon (alloy), a metal alloy containing mostly copper or bronze with small quantity of silver

People
Claudius Billon (1896–1944), French air force officer
Jean-Louis Billon (born 1964), Ivorian politician
Jonathan Le Billon (born 1980), British actor
Nicolas Billon (born 1978), Canadian writer
Philippe Le Billon, geographer, author, and professor
Pierre Billon (writer) (born 1937), novelist and screenwriter
Pierre Billon (director) (1901–1981), French film director and screenwriter
René Billon (1931 – 2020), French footballer
Thomas Billon ( 1617–1647), French anagrammatist
Yves Billon (born 1946), French documentary film-maker

See also

 Billion (disambiguation)